Antti Yrjö Pesonen (27 December 1888, Kauhava – 2 March 1966) was a Finnish farmer, journalist, insurance executive and politician. He served as a Member of the Parliament of Finland from 1919 to 1922, representing the Agrarian League.

References

1888 births
1966 deaths
People from Kauhava
People from Vaasa Province (Grand Duchy of Finland)
Centre Party (Finland) politicians
Members of the Parliament of Finland (1919–22)